Muse is a 2017 English-language Spanish supernatural thriller film directed by Jaume Balagueró. The screenplay, written by Balagueró and Fernando Navarro, is based on José Carlos Somoza's 2003 Spanish novel The Lady Number Thirteen. The film stars Elliot Cowan, Franka Potente, Ana Ularu, Joanne Whalley, Christopher Lloyd and Leonor Watling. It was released in Spain on 1 December 2017.

Synopsis
Samuel Solomon, a literature professor, experiences a recurring nightmare ever since the death of his girlfriend, in which a woman is brutally murdered. When the same woman in his dreams is found dead in reality, Solomon seeks an explanation. Rachel, a woman who claims to have also dreamed of the murder, helps Solomon in discovering the identity of the mysterious woman.

Cast

 Elliot Cowan as Samuel Solomon
 Franka Potente as Susan
 Ana Ularu as Rachel
 Joanne Whalley as Jacqueline
 Christopher Lloyd as Rauschen
 Leonor Watling as Lidia
 Manuela Vellés as Beatriz

Production
In late October 2014, it was announced that Balagueró came on board to direct the film. An adaptation of José Carlos Somoza's novel The Lady Number Thirteen, Muse is the third English-language film he directed following the 2002 film Darkness  and the 2005 film Fragile. Of the project, Balagueró said:

Principal photography began in December 2016, shot on location in Belgium, the Republic of Ireland and Spain.

References

External links
 
 

2017 films
English-language Spanish films
English-language Belgian films
English-language Irish films
Films directed by Jaume Balagueró
Films shot in Belgium
Films shot in Ireland
Films shot in Spain
Films with screenplays by Jaume Balagueró
2010s supernatural thriller films
Filmax films
Castelao Producciones films
2010s English-language films
2010s Spanish films